The Bistra (in its upper course also: Bistra Mare) is a left tributary of the river Capra in Romania. It flows into the Capra in Telec.

References

Rivers of Romania
Rivers of Neamț County